Ballycannan is a village in County Clare, Ireland.

References

Towns and villages in County Clare